The Edward Jancarz Memorial is an annual speedway event held each year organized by the Stal Gorzów Wlkp. The Memorial held in the Edward Jancarz Stadium in Gorzów Wielkopolski. Memorial is irregular and first staged in 1992, when Edward Jancarz was murdered.

Podium

Individual

Pairs

See also 
 motorcycle speedway

External links 
 Stal Gorzów Wielkopolski website

 
Memorial
Speedway